Surfers Paradise is the second studio album by Australian recording artist Cody Simpson, released on 16 July 2013 by Atlantic Records. The album includes the singles "Pretty Brown Eyes", "Summertime of Our Lives", and "La Da Dee".  The album is named after the Surfers Paradise beach on Gold Coast, Queensland, Australia, where Simpson grew up. This was Simpson's second and final studio album under Atlantic Records.

The album debuted at number 10 on the US Billboard 200 with over 24,000 copies sold in its first week.

Background 
On 18 May 2013, Simpson announced that his upcoming second studio album "Surfers Paradise" would be released on 16 July. The album would include the already released single "Pretty Brown Eyes", which was described by Billboard as a "happy-go-lucky... summer anthem".

Of the album title, Simpson explained to Seventeen Magazine "I try to stay very, very true to my roots and my lifestyle and I wanted to be able to share that with my fans. I thought that the title was perfect because I wanted to stay in the paradise theme but also build a title that would reflect that and the sound of the music". He also explained that the album was "definitely a classic summer album" sound-wise, and that there would be "a few reggae songs... a lot of acoustic guitar, some ukulele".

Promotion 
To promote the album, Simpson appeared on various television and radio shows both in North America and in Australia, including the Young Hollywood Awards, The Morning Show, and Sunrise.

He also commenced his first headlining tour, the Paradise Tour, on 30 May 2013. This tour consisted of 48 shows throughout the United States and Canada, and finished on 31 January 2014. The concerts included songs from Surfers Paradise, as well as Simpson's previous album Paradise, and EPs Coast to Coast and 4 U.

Singles
 "Pretty Brown Eyes" was released as the lead single from the album on 23 April 2013.
 "Summertime of Our Lives" was released as the second single from the album on 18 June 2013
 "La Da Dee" was released as the third single from the album on 12 September 2013. This song was featured in the film Cloudy with a Chance of Meatballs 2 as well as the Nickelodeon Original Movie, "One Crazy Cruise".
 "Surfboard" was released as a stand alone single on 15 April 2014. The music video featured his then-girlfriend, Gigi Hadid. Surfboard was later added to the Expanded Edition of Surfers Paradise, which was released on streaming in 2019.

Track listing

Charts

Release history

References

2013 albums
Cody Simpson albums